The 2016–17 Mississippi Valley State Delta Devils basketball team represented Mississippi Valley State University in the 2016–17 NCAA Division I men's basketball season. The Delta Devils, led by third-year head coach Andre Payne, played their home games at the Harrison HPER Complex in Itta Bena, Mississippi as members of the Southwestern Athletic Conference. They finished the season 7–25, 7–11 in SWAC play to finish in seventh place. As the No. 7 seed in the SWAC tournament, they lost to Alcorn State in the quarterfinals.

Previous season 
The Delta Devils finished the 2015–16 season 8–27, 6–12 in SWAC play to finish in a three-way tie for seventh place. They defeated Grambling State and Alcorn State to advance to the semifinals of the SWAC tournament where they lost to Jackson State.

Roster

Schedule and results

|-
!colspan=9 style=| Exhibition

|-
!colspan=9 style=| Non-conference regular season

|-
!colspan=9 style=| SWAC regular season

|-
!colspan=9 style=|SWAC tournament

References

Mississippi Valley State Delta Devils basketball seasons
Mississippi Valley State
Mississippi Valley
Mississippi Valley